Isaiah 66 is the sixty-sixth and final chapter of the Book of Isaiah in the Hebrew Bible or the Old Testament of the Christian Bible. This book contains the prophecies attributed to the prophet Isaiah, and is one of the Books of the Prophets. Chapters 56–66 are often referred to as Trito-Isaiah. This chapter contains an oracle delivered after the temple in Jerusalem had been re-built following the Jewish peoples' return from exile, and warns against "an unduly materialistic" approach to the worship of God.

Text 
The original text was written in Hebrew language. This chapter is divided into 24 verses.

Textual witnesses
Some early manuscripts containing the text of this chapter in Hebrew are of the Masoretic Text tradition, which includes the Codex Cairensis (895), the Petersburg Codex of the Prophets (916), Aleppo Codex (10th century), Codex Leningradensis (1008).

Fragments containing parts of this chapter were found among the Dead Sea Scrolls (3rd century BC or later):
 1QIsaa: complete
 1QIsab: extant verses 1‑24
 4QIsab (4Q56): extant verse 24
 4QIsac (4Q57): extant verses 20‑24

There is also a translation into Koine Greek known as the Septuagint, made in the last few centuries BCE. Extant ancient manuscripts of the Septuagint version include Codex Vaticanus (B; B; 4th century), Codex Sinaiticus (S; BHK: S; 4th century), Codex Alexandrinus (A; A; 5th century) and Codex Marchalianus (Q; Q; 6th century).

Parashot
The parashah sections listed here are based on the Aleppo Codex. Isaiah 66 is a part of the Consolations (Isaiah 40–66). {S}: closed parashah.
 {S} 66:1-4 {S} 66:5-9 {S} 66:10-11 {S} 66:12-14 {S} 66:15-24 {end of book}

Worshippers, welcome and unwelcome (66:1–5)
This part contains the rebuke to "ecclesiasticism" – 'the spirit that would build human walls around God' (verses 1–2a; cf. ;  and 'breed unreality' (verse 3) and 'intolerance' (verse 5). It is not a protest against the rebuilding of the temple, because it was the command of God.

The last intervention (66:6–17)
The focus of this section is the end time, where the nation.. brought forth in a moment (cf. ) with a final divine intervention.

Verse 12
For thus saith the LORD,
Behold, I will extend peace to her like a river, and the glory of the Gentiles like a flowing stream:
then shall ye suck, ye shall be borne upon her sides, and be dandled upon her knees.
Cross reference for "glory of the Gentiles": Isaiah 2:3; Isaiah 11:10; Isaiah 43:6; Isaiah 49:22; Isaiah 60:3

Verse 17
They that sanctify themselves and purify themselves to go unto the gardens, behind one in the midst,
eating swine's flesh, and the detestable thing, and the mouse,
shall be consumed together, saith the LORD.
The Jerusalem Bible describes this verse as "a fragment condemning pagan mysteries" linked with verses 3 and 4.

The nations gathered in (66:18–24)
God states his purpose for the world to gather them (verse 18) with his means to carry it out into Jerusalem (verses 19–21), to witness the final glory and perdition. In Christian apocalyptic view, this can be connected to the first and second comings (or only the second coming) of Jesus Christ.

Verse 19
And I will set a sign among them, 
and I will send those that escape of them unto the nations,
to Tarshish, Pul, and Lud, that draw the bow,
to Tubal, and Javan, to the isles afar off,
that have not heard my fame, neither have seen my glory;
and they shall declare my glory among the Gentiles.
The names listed here represent the distant outposts of the world known to Israel at the time.

Verse 24
And they shall go forth,
and look upon the carcases of the men that have transgressed against me:
for their worm shall not die, 
neither shall their fire be quenched; 
and they shall be an abhorring unto all flesh.
"Quench": Illusion of a fire which cannot be 'quenched', from the Hebrew root: k-b-h (kabah, "to be quenched or extinguished, to go out"), links this verse (the last verse of the ending chapter) to the last verse of the beginning chapter of the whole book (Isaiah 1:31: "none shall quench"). Moreover, it is also used in three other places: (1) of the servant in Isaiah 42:3, that "a dimly burning wick ('smoking flax') he will not quench"; (2) that 'the fire devouring Edom "will not be quenched"' (34:10), and (3) 'those who oppose the LORD'S path are "quenched like a wick"' (43:17).

See also

Related Bible parts: Mark 9, Revelation 20

References

Sources

External links

Jewish
Isaiah 66 Original Hebrew with Parallel English

Christian
Isaiah 66 English Translation with Parallel Latin Vulgate

66